Piccadilly Jim is a silent romantic comedy film released in 1919. The cast includes Owen Moore, Zena Keefe, and George Bunny. It is based on the 1917 novel Piccadilly Jim by P. G. Wodehouse. Wesley Ruggles directed. It was filmed in New York City and produced by Selznick Pictures Corporation. Two other films based on the same novel were also released, 1936 film and a 2004 film.

Cast

 Owen Moore as James Crocker, also known as Piccadilly Jim
 Zena Keefe as Ann Chester
 George Bunny as Mr. Bingley Crocker
 William T. Hays as Peter Pett
 Dora Mills Adams as Mrs. Peter Pett
 Alfred Hickman as Lord Wisebeach
 Reginald Sheffield as Ogden Pett

References

External links
 

1919 films
American romantic comedy films
Films based on works by P. G. Wodehouse
American black-and-white films
American silent feature films
Selznick Pictures films
1919 romantic comedy films
Films directed by Wesley Ruggles
1910s American films
Silent romantic comedy films
Silent American comedy films
1910s English-language films